Events from the year 1794 in the United States.

Incumbents

Federal Government 
 President: George Washington (no political party-Virginia)
 Vice President: John Adams (F-Massachusetts)
 Chief Justice: John Jay (New York)
 Speaker of the House of Representatives: Frederick Muhlenberg (Anti-Admin.-Pennsylvania)
 Congress: 3rd

Events

 January 13 – The U.S. Congress enacts a law providing for, effective May 1, 1795, a United States flag of 15 stars and 15 stripes, in recognition of the recent admission of Vermont and Kentucky as the 14th and 15th states. A subsequent act restores the number of stripes to 13, but provides for additional stars upon the admission of each additional state.
 February 11 – The first session of the United States Senate is open to the public.
 March 14 – Eli Whitney is granted a patent for the cotton gin.
 March 27 – The United States Government authorizes the building of the first six United States Navy vessels (in 1797 the first 3 frigates, USS United States, USS Constellation and USS Constitution go into service), not to be confused with October 13, 1775, which is observed as the Navy's Birthday .
 July 17 – Whiskey Rebellion: 500 armed Pennsylvanians attack and burn the home of General John Neville.
 August 7 – Whiskey Rebellion: President Washington invokes the Militia Acts of 1792 mobilize a federal army of 12,500 men. The force would later be put under the command of General "Light Horse Harry" Lee to be led into western Pennsylvania against the insurrection.
 September 10 – The University of Tennessee is established at Knoxville.
 November – Whiskey Rebellion: The federal army quells the uprising and begins the return march to Philadelphia with prisoners.
 November 19 – The United States and Great Britain sign the Jay Treaty (coming into effect 1796), which attempts to clear up some issues left over from the American Revolutionary War and secures a decade of peaceful trade between the two nations. Britain agrees to evacuate border forts in the Northwest Territory (roughly the area north of the Ohio River and east of the Mississippi) and thereby end British support for the Indians.
 December 8 – The Great New Orleans Fire (1794) burns over 200 buildings in the French Quarter.
 December 23 – St. Louis Cathedral, New Orleans is dedicated.

Undated
 Thomas Paine's The Age of Reason, dedicated to "Fellow Citizens of the United States of America", is published.
 Springfield Armory is founded, one of the most universally known and influential gun producers in the United States.

Ongoing
 Northwest Indian War (1785–1795)

Births
 March 16 – Lawrence Brainerd, U.S. Senator from Vermont from 1854 to 1855 (died 1870)
 April 10
 Matthew C. Perry, commodore (died 1858)
 John McCracken Robinson, U.S. Senator from Illinois from 1830 to 1841 (died 1843)
 April 11 – Edward Everett, politician (died 1865)
 May 27 – Cornelius Vanderbilt, entrepreneur (died 1877)
 June 7 – Elias Kane, U.S. Senator from Illinois from 1825 to 1835 (died 1835)
 July 5 – Sylvester Graham, nutritionist and inventor (died 1851)
 August 10 – Jackson Morton, U.S. Senator from Florida from 1849 to 1855 (died 1874)
 October 6 – Charles Wilkins Short, botanist (died 1863)
 October 22 – Carlos Wilcox, poet (died 1827)
 October 23 – Oliver H. Smith, U.S. Senator from Indiana from 1837 to 1843 (died 1859)
 November 3 – William Cullen Bryant, romantic poet, journalist and long-time editor of the New York Evening Post (died 1878)
 November 10 – Alexander O. Anderson, U.S. Senator from Tennessee from 1840 to 1841 (died 1869)
 Date unknown – Arthur P. Bagby, U.S. Senator from Alabama from 1837 to 1841 (died 1858)
 Approximate date – Maria Gowen Brooks, born Abigail Gowen, poet (died 1845)

Deaths
 September 15 – Abraham Clark, American signer of the Declaration of Independence (b. 1725)
 June 19 – Richard Henry Lee, 12th President of the Confederation Congress. signatory of the Continental Association, Declaration of Independence, and United States Constitution  (b. 1732)
 November 15 – John Witherspoon, American signer of the Declaration of Independence (b. 1723)
 November 22 – John Alsop, American Continental Congressman (b. 1724)

See also
Timeline of United States history (1790–1819)

Further reading
 Edward Thornton. The United States through English Spectacles in 1792–1794. The Pennsylvania Magazine of History and Biography, Vol. 9, No. 2 (July 1885).
 Ezekiel Forman. Amusements and Politics in Philadelphia, 1794. The Pennsylvania Magazine of History and Biography, Vol. 10, No. 2 (July 1886), pp. 182–187.
 The Illinois Indians to Captain Abner Prior, 1794. The American Historical Review, Vol. 4, No. 1 (October 1898), pp. 107–111.
 Robert Wellford. A Diary Kept by Dr. Robert Wellford, of Fredericksburg, Virginia, during the March of the Virginia Troops to Fort Pitt (Pittsburg) to Suppress the Whiskey Insurrection in 1794. The William and Mary Quarterly, Vol. 11, No. 1 (July 1902), pp. 1–19.
 Medford Rum for Africa, 1792–1794. Proceedings of the Massachusetts Historical Society, Third Series, Vol. 44 (October, 1910 – June 1911).
 Samuel Flagg Bemis. The United States and the Abortive Armed Neutrality of 1794. The American Historical Review, Vol. 24, No. 1 (October 1918), pp. 26–47.
 The Democratic Societies of 1793 and 1794 in Kentucky, Pennsylvania and Virginia. The William and Mary Quarterly, Second Series, Vol. 2, No. 4 (October 1922), pp. 239–243.
 Arthur Preston Whitaker. Harry Innes and the Spanish Intrigue: 1794–1795. The Mississippi Valley Historical Review, Vol. 15, No. 2 (September 1928), pp. 236–248.
 F. W. Howay, T. C. Elliott. Voyages of the "Jenny" to Oregon, 1792–94. Oregon Historical Quarterly, Vol. 30, No. 3 (September 1929), pp. 197–206.
 Edgar Erskine Hume. A Proposed Alliance Between the Order of Malta and the United States, 1794: Suggestions Made to James Monroe as American Minister in Paris. The William and Mary Quarterly, Second Series, Vol. 16, No. 2 (April 1936), pp. 222–233.
 William Miller. First Fruits of Republican Organization: Political Aspects of the Congressional Election of 1794. The Pennsylvania Magazine of History and Biography, Vol. 63, No. 2 (April 1939), pp. 118–143.
 Fillmore Norfleet. Norfolk, Portsmouth, and Gosport as Seen by Moreau De Saint-Mery in March, April and May 1794. The Virginia Magazine of History and Biography, Vol. 48, No. 2 (April 1940), pp. 153–164.
 Eugene P. Link. Papers of the Republican Society of Portland, 1794–1796. The New England Quarterly, Vol. 16, No. 2 (June 1943), pp. 299–316.
 Harry M. Tinkcom. Presque Isle and Pennsylvania politics, 1794. Pennsylvania History, Vol. 16, No. 2 (April 1949), pp. 96–121.
 Coolie Verner. Some Observations on the Philadelphia 1794 Editions of Jefferson's "Notes". Studies in Bibliography, Vol. 2, (1949/1950), pp. 201–204.
 James Napier. Some Book Sales in Dumfries, Virginia, 1794–1796. The William and Mary Quarterly, Third Series, Vol. 10, No. 3 (July 1953), pp. 441–445.
 Norman B. Wilkinson . Mr. Davy's diary 1794. Pennsylvania History, Vol. 20, No. 2 (1953), pp. 123–141.
 Wayne's Western Campaign: The Wayne-Knox Correspondence, 1793–1794. The Pennsylvania Magazine of History and Biography, Vol. 78, No. 3 (July 1954), pp. 298–341.
 Marshall Smelser. The Passage of the Naval Act of 1794. Military Affairs, Vol. 22, No. 1 (Spring 1958), pp. 1–12.
 Donald H. Kent and Merle H. Deardorff. John Adlum on the Allegheny: Memoirs for the Year 1794. The Pennsylvania Magazine of History and Biography, Vol. 84, No. 3 (July 1960).
 John L. Earl III. Talleyrand in Philadelphia, 1794–1796. The Pennsylvania Magazine of History and Biography, Vol. 91, No. 3 (July 1967), pp. 282–298.
 Edwin R. Baldridge Jr. Talleyrand's visit to Pennsylvania, 1794–1796. Pennsylvania History, Vol. 36, No. 2 (1969), pp. 145–160.
 James R. Beasley. Emerging Republicanism and the Standing Order: The Appropriation Act Controversy in Connecticut, 1793 to 1795. The William and Mary Quarterly, Third Series, Vol. 29, No. 4 (October 1972), pp. 587–610.
 George E. Brooks, Jr.  The Providence African Society's Sierra Leone Emigration Scheme, 1794-1795: Prologue to the African Colonization Movement. The International Journal of African Historical Studies, Vol. 7, No. 2 (1974), pp. 183–202.
 David O. Whitten. An Economic Inquiry into the Whiskey Rebellion of 1794. Agricultural History, Vol. 49, No. 3 (July  1975), pp. 491–504.
 William A. Hunter. John Badollet's "Journal of the Time I Spent in Stony Creeck Glades," 1793–1794. The Pennsylvania Magazine of History and Biography, Vol. 104, No. 2 (April 1980), pp. 162–199.
 Leland R. Johnson. The Doyle Mission to Massac, 1794. Journal of the Illinois State Historical Society, Vol. 73, No. 1 (Spring 1980), pp. 2–16.
 Roland M. Baumann. Philadelphia's Manufacturers and the Excise Taxes of 1794: The Forging of the Jeffersonian Coalition. The Pennsylvania Magazine of History and Biography, Vol. 106, No. 1 (January 1982), pp. 3–39.
 Seymour S. Cohen. Two Refugee Chemists in the United States, 1794: How We See Them. Proceedings of the American Philosophical Society, Vol. 126, No. 4 (August 1982), pp. 301–315.
 Michael L. Kennedy. A French Jacobin Club in Charleston, South Carolina, 1792–1795. The South Carolina Historical Magazine, Vol. 91, No. 1 (January 1990), pp. 4–22.
 Jack Campisi and William A. Starna. On the Road to Canandaigua: The Treaty of 1794. American Indian Quarterly, Vol. 19, No. 4 (Autumn 1995), pp. 467–490.
 David P. Currie. The Constitution in Congress: The Third Congress, 1793–1795. The University of Chicago Law Review, Vol. 63, No. 1 (Winter 1996), pp. 1–48.
 Albrecht Koschnik. The Democratic Societies of Philadelphia and the Limits of the American Public Sphere, c. 1793–1795. William and Mary Quarterly, Third Series, Vol. 58, No. 3 (July 2001), pp. 615–636.
 Daniel R. Mandell. "The Indian's Pedigree" (1794): Indians, Folklore, and Race in Southern New England. The William and Mary Quarterly, Third Series, Vol. 61, No. 3 (July 2004), pp. 521–538.

References

External links
 

 
1790s in the United States
United States
United States
Years of the 18th century in the United States